Barbara Ann Gray  is a senior police officer in the United Kingdom. Serving with the Police Service of Northern Ireland (PSNI) from 1989 onwards, she transferred to the Metropolitan Police in April 2021 as a Deputy Assistant Commissioner to fill a post left vacant by Lucy D'Orsi's appointment as Chief Constable of the British Transport Police, with her promotion to Assistant Commissioner (Professionalism) announced in September 2022.

Growing up outside Newry and studying Geography and English at the Jordanstown campus of Ulster University, she was inspired to join the Police when one of its officers was killed by a car-bomb outside her house when she was 14. She was promoted to Sergeant in 1994, moving from Dungannon to Enniskillen and then to Antrim on her promotion to Inspector (2002).

Her promotion to Chief Inspector in 2006 brought with it an appointment as Area Commander for Ballymena, prior to service as Superintendent for Armagh, Newry and Down from 2009 then for A District (i.e. north and west Belfast) from 2011. Promotion to Chief Superintendent came in 2014. She became Temporary Assistant Chief Constable in 2017, with responsibility as strategic commander for public order, firearms and CBRN response before being confirmed in that rank in June 2020.

Gray was awarded the Queen's Police Medal (QPM) in the 2016 Birthday Honours. She was appointed Lieutenant of the Royal Victorian Order (LVO) in the 2023 New Year Honours for services to royalty protection.

Honours

References

Living people
Alumni of Ulster University
People from Newry
Police Service of Northern Ireland officers
Women Metropolitan Police officers
Year of birth missing (living people)
Northern Irish recipients of the Queen's Police Medal
Assistant Commissioners of Police of the Metropolis
Lieutenants of the Royal Victorian Order